This is about the football player. For the Puerto Rican politician, see Jorge Suárez Cáceres.

Jorge Suárez Landaverde  (17 April 1945 – 12 January 1997) was a former Salvadoran footballer.

Club career
Nicknamed El Calero, he is considered to be one of the best goalkeepers El Salvador has ever produced.

He played for several clubs in El Salvador and made his debut at the highest level with FAS in 1972.

The Estadio Jorge Calero Suárez was named after him on 27 September 1996, just three months prior to his death, to cancer.

References

External links
Bio - La Prensa Gráfica 

1945 births
1997 deaths
People from Santa Ana Department
Association football goalkeepers
Salvadoran footballers
Salvadoran expatriate footballers
C.D. FAS footballers
C.D. Águila footballers
Xelajú MC players
Once Municipal footballers
American Soccer League (1933–1983) players
Expatriate footballers in Guatemala
Expatriate soccer players in the United States
Salvadoran football managers
Deaths from cancer in El Salvador
Salvadoran expatriate sportspeople in Guatemala
Salvadoran expatriate sportspeople in the United States